The Archdeacon of Dorking is a senior ecclesiastical officer in the Diocese of Guildford, responsible for clergy discipline and church buildings within the area of her/his archdeaconry.

History
The Archdeaconry of Dorking is a subdivision of the Church of England Diocese of Guildford (itself part of the Province of Canterbury.) The archdeaconry consists of the deaneries of Dorking, Emly, Epsom, Leatherhead, Runnymede and Woking. The archdeaconry of Dorking was split from archdeaconry of Surrey by Order in Council on 17 August 1928.

List of archdeacons
1928–8 July 1930 (d.): Ronald Irwin DSO MC
1930–1936 (res.): Cyril Golding-Bird, Assistant Bishop (became Archdeacon of Surrey)
1936–24 July 1954 (d.): Edward Newill
1954–1957 (res.): David Loveday
1957–23 December 1962 (d.): Windsor Roberts
1963–1968 (res.): Kenneth Evans
1968–1982 (ret.): William Purcell
1982–1990 (ret.): Peter Hogben (afterwards archdeacon emeritus)
1990–1995 (res.): Christopher Herbert
1995–2005 (res.): Mark Wilson (archdeacon emeritus since 2011)
2005–2013: Julian Henderson
2014"summer" 2019 (announced): Paul Bryer
24 November 2019present: Martin Breadmore

Notes

References

Sources
1927 Diocese of Guildford Bishops Deans and Archdeacons of Dorking (Retrieved 16 February 2013)